The COPSS Presidents' Award is given annually by the Committee of Presidents of Statistical Societies to a young statistician in recognition of outstanding contributions to the profession of statistics.  

The COPSS Presidents' Award is generally regarded as one of the highest honours in the field of statistics, along with the International Prize in Statistics. 

Specifically, eligible candidates either i)  will be under age 41 throughout the award calendar year, or ii) will be under age 46 throughout the award calendar year and will have received a terminal statistically-related degree no more than 12 years prior to that year. For example, an individual eligible for 2016 nomination under (ii) must have been born in 1971 or later with terminal statistically-related degree dated 2004 or later. Prior to 2005 the award was given to a statistician not yet having reached his or her 41st birthday during the calendar year of the award.

The COPSS Presidents' Award is awarded by the five sponsoring statistical societies:
 The American Statistical Association (ASA)
 The Statistical Society of Canada (SSC)
 The Institute of Mathematical Statistics (IMS)
 The Eastern North American Region of the International Biometric Society (ENAR)
 The Western North American Region of the International Biometric Society (WNAR)

The presentation of the award takes place at the annual Joint Statistical Meetings (JSM).

Winners of the COPSS Presidents' Award

 1981: Peter J. Bickel, University of California, Berkeley
 1982: Stephen Fienberg, Carnegie Mellon University
 1983: Tze Leung Lai, Stanford University
 1984: David V. Hinkley, University of California, Santa Barbara
 1985: James O. Berger, Duke University
 1986: Ross L. Prentice, Fred Hutchinson Cancer Research Center
 1987: C.F. Jeff Wu, Georgia Institute of Technology
 1988: Raymond J. Carroll, Texas A&M University
 1989: Peter Hall, Australian National University
 1990: Peter McCullagh, University of Chicago
 1991: Bernard Silverman, University of Oxford
 1992: Nancy Reid, University of Toronto
 1993: Wing Hung Wong, Stanford University
 1994: David L. Donoho, Stanford University
 1995: Iain M. Johnstone, Stanford University
 1996: Robert J. Tibshirani, Stanford University
 1997: Kathryn Roeder, Carnegie Mellon University
 1998: Pascal Massart, Université de Paris-Sud
 1999: Larry A. Wasserman, Carnegie Mellon University
 2000: Jianqing Fan, Princeton University
 2001: Xiao-Li Meng, Harvard University
 2002: Jun Liu, Harvard University
 2003: Andrew Gelman, Columbia University
 2004: Michael A. Newton, University of Wisconsin
 2005: Mark J. van der Laan, University of California, Berkeley
 2006: Xihong Lin, Harvard University
 2007: Jeff Rosenthal, University of Toronto
 2008: T. Tony Cai, University of Pennsylvania
 2009: Rafael Irizarry, Harvard University
 2010: David Dunson, Duke University
 2011: Nilanjan Chatterjee, Johns Hopkins University
 2012: Samuel Kou, Harvard University
 2013: Marc A. Suchard, UCLA
 2014: Martin J. Wainwright,  University of California, Berkeley
 2015: John D. Storey, Princeton University
 2016: Nicolai Meinshausen, ETH Zürich
 2017: Tyler J. VanderWeele, Harvard University
 2018: Richard J. Samworth, University of Cambridge
 2019: Hadley Wickham, RStudio, Inc.
 2020: Rina Foygel Barber, University of Chicago
 2021: Jeffrey T. Leek, Johns Hopkins University
 2022: Daniela Witten, University of Washington
Note: Listed are recipients' current working institutions not when awarded COPSS.

Peter J. Bickel, Stephen Fienberg, James O. Berger, Ross L. Prentice, C.F. Jeff Wu, Raymond J. Carroll, Kathryn Roeder, Wing Hung Wong are also R. A. Fisher Lecturers.

See also

 List of mathematics awards
 Rousseeuw Prize for Statistics

References

Statistical awards
Awards established in 1981